Tony Sbalbi AKA "Tony the tiger" (born 4 September 1969) is a French ski mountaineer and non-commissioned officer of the chasseurs alpins corps.

Sbalbi was born in Aix-en-Provence. He attended the Lycée Jean Raynouard in Brignoles. At the age of 18 years he joined the army, where he became instructor at the École militaire de haute montagne (EMHM) in Chamonix. In 1989 he participated in his first ski mountaineering race, and has been member of the French national team since 2002.

Selected results 
 2001:
 6th, European Championship team race (together with Laurent Fabre)
 2002:
 2nd, World Championship team race (together with Patrick Blanc)
 3rd, French Championship single
 6th, World Championship combination ranking
 2005:
 4th, European Championship relay race (together with Florent Perrier, Bertrand Blanc and Grégory Gachet)
 8th, European Championship vertical race
 2006:
 2nd, World Championship vertical race
 2nd, Swiss Championship vertical race
 2007:
 3rd, European Championship relay race (together with Yannick Buffet, Bertrand Blanc and Fabien Anselmet)
 5th, European Championship vertical race
 9th, European Championship team race (together with Patrick Blanc)
 2008:
 8th, World Championship long distance race
 2009:
 2nd, European Championship vertical race
 5th, European Championship relay race (together with Didier Blanc, Nicolas Bonnet and Martial Premat)
 2010:
 7th, World Championship team race (together with Grégory Gachet)
 9th, World Championship vertical race
 2011:
 1st, Sellaronda Skimarathon, together with Alain Seletto

Patrouille des Glaciers 

 2000: 6th (international military teams ranking), together with Sgt chef Laurent Fabre and Adj Patrick Rassat
 2006: 6th (and 1st "seniors II" ranking), together with Olivier Nägele and Alexander Lugger
 2008: 6th (and 5th in the "international men" ranking), together with Alexandre Pellicier and Didier Blanc
 2010: 7th (and 6th "ISMF men" ranking), together with Adrien Piccot and Philippe Blanc

Pierra Menta 

 1999: 9th, together with Laurent Fabre
 2002: 6th, together with Patrick Blanc
 2003: 1st, together with Patrick Blanc
 2004: 6th, together with Patrick Blanc
 2005: 8th, together with Cyril Champange
 2006: 4th, together with Denis Trento
 2007: 5th, together with Denis Trento
 2008: 6th, together with Ivan Murada
 2009: 4th, together with Didier Blanc
 2012: 9th, together with Jean Pellissier

Trofeo Mezzalama 

 2003: 9th, together with Patrick Blanc and Cédric Tomio
 2007: 4th, together with Martin Riz and Alain Seletto
 2009: 3rd, together with Didier Blanc and Alain Seletto

References

External links 
 Tony Sbalbi at SkiMountaineering.org

1969 births
Living people
French male ski mountaineers
French military patrol (sport) runners
Sportspeople from Aix-en-Provence